Ruslan Dashko (born 13 August 1996) is a Russian handball player who plays for Angel Ximenez Avia Puente Genil and the Russian national team.

He competed at the 2016 European Men's Handball Championship.

References

1996 births
Living people
Russian male handball players